Foundation University may refer to:
 Foundation University (Philippines), in Dumaguete, Philippines
 Foundation University Islamabad, in Islamabad, Pakistan
 Foundation University Medical College, a college of the Foundation University Islamabad